Esports at the 2023 Southeast Asian Games is set to take place in around May 2023 in Cambodia.

Nine medals are contested in esports which consists of five games and nine events. Participating nations, can only enter in seven out of nine events. Host Cambodia can enter all nine events.

Medal summary

PC

Mobile

References

Esports at the Southeast Asian Games